John Systad (14 September 1912 – 16 September 1998) was a Norwegian long-distance runner who specialized in the marathon race. He represented TIF Viking in Bergen.
 
He finished twelfth at the 1946 European Championships, eighth at the 1948 Summer Olympics, ninth at the 1950 European Championships and finally 34th at the 1952 Summer Olympics. He became Norwegian marathon champion in the years 1950-1953 and 1955.

His personal best time was 2:32:16 hours, achieved in October 1956 in Sandvika.

Achievements

References

1912 births
1998 deaths
Norwegian male long-distance runners
Athletes (track and field) at the 1948 Summer Olympics
Athletes (track and field) at the 1952 Summer Olympics
Olympic athletes of Norway
Place of birth missing
Place of death missing